Any Second Now is a 1969 TV film directed by Gene Levitt and starring Stewart Granger and Lois Nettleton. The film score was composed by Leonard Rosenman.

Plot

A philandering photographer plans to kill his wife. He fails and the wife gets amnesia.

Cast
Stewart Granger as Paul Dennison
Lois Nettleton as Nancy Dennison
Joseph Campanella as  Doctor Raul Valdez
Dana Wynter as Jane Peterson
Katy Jurado as Senora Vorhis
Tom Tully as Howard Lenihan
Marion Ross as Mrs Hoyt
Eileen Wesson as  American Girl
Bob Hastings as   Gary
Francine York as Samantha
Bill McCright as   American Tourist
Victor Millan as Luis de Cordova
John Alladin as Dallas Mitchell

Production
Any Second Now was Granger's first Hollywood film in six years. Filming began 11 February 1969.

Reception
The Los Angeles Times called Any Second Now "susenseful and sudsy enough to hold the viewer's attention."

References

External links

1969 television films
1969 films
American television films
Films scored by Leonard Rosenman
Films about photographers
Films directed by Gene Levitt